Labib Habachi (لبيب حبشي) (April 18, 1906 – February 18, 1984) was an influential Coptic Egyptian Egyptologist.

Dr Habachi spent 30 years in the Antiquities Department of the Egyptian Government, ending his career as Chief inspector. During this period he spent an enormous amount of time in numerous dig sites in Egypt and the Sudan. He left government work to accept a position at the Oriental Institute of the University of Chicago as an Archaeological Consultant to its Nubian Expedition.

Tell el-Dab'a
Between 1929 and 1939, Pierre Montet excavated at Tanis, finding the royal necropolis of the Twenty-first and Twenty-second Dynasties — the finds there almost equalled that of Tutankhamun's tomb in the Valley of the Kings. He believed that he found the location of Avaris, and this opinion was widely accepted at the time.

Yet Habachi was not convinced. In 1941-42 he worked at Tell el-Dab'a for the Egyptian Antiquities Service and came to the conclusion that this was in fact Avaris.

Works (selection)
 "Khata'na-Qantir: importance". Annales du Service des antiquités de l'Egypte, Vol. LII,1 (1952), p. 443-562
 Tell Basta. SASAE, cahier 22. Cairo, 1957
 with Henry Riad: Aswan: the town with a glorious past and a promising future. Cairo, 1959
 Features of the deification of Ramesses II. ADAIK, Vol. 5. Glückstadt, 1969
 The second Stela of Kamose and his struggle against the Hyksos ruler and his capital. ADAIK, Vol. 8. Glückstadt, 1972
 The Obelisks of Egypt: Skyscrapers of the Past. Scribner's Sons, 1977
 with Pierre Anus: Le tombeau de Naÿ à Gournet Marʻeï (no. 271). Cairo, 1977
 Sixteen studies on lower Nubia. SASAE, cahier 23. Cairo, 1981
 Elephantine IV. The sanctuary of Heqaib (2 vols.). ADAIK, Vol. 33. Mainz, 1985
 Studies on the Middle Kingdom. Studia Aegyptiaca, Vol. 10. Budapest, 1987
 with Zakī Tāwaḍrūs: في صحراء العرب والأديرة الشرقية. الحلقة الأولى. في الآثار الشرقية / تأليف لبيب حبشي، زكي تاوضروس (Fī ṣaḥrāʼ al-ʻArab wa-al-adyirah al-sharqīyah: al-ḥalqah al-úlá fī al-āthār al-Qibṭīyah). Maktabat Madbūlī (Cairo), 1993

Full bibliography in J. Kamil, Labib Habachi.

Decorations and awards
 1953 Member of the German Archaeological Institute
 1964 Member of the Institut d'Égypte
 1965 the Egyptology Institute of Charles University in Prague
 1983 Honorary Member of the Société Française d'Egypte.
 Egyptian state award and a medal for the first class in the humanities and natural sciences,
 1959 Order of Merit of the Italian Republic
 1973 Order of Merit of the Legion of Honour (France) 
 1980 Austrian Cross of Honour for Science and Art, 1st class
 1966 Honorary doctorate from New York University
 1978 Honorary President of the International Association of Coptic Studies
 1981 recipient of Festschrift (MDAIK 37), presented at the German Archaeological Institute

Notes

References
 Jill Kamil, Labib Habachi: The Life and legacy of an Egyptologist. American University in Cairo Press, 2007. 

1906 births
1984 deaths
People from Mansoura, Egypt
Egyptian Egyptologists
Egyptian Copts
Recipients of the Order of Merit of the Italian Republic
Recipients of the Legion of Honour
Recipients of the Austrian Cross of Honour for Science and Art, 1st class